"America the Beautiful" is an American patriotic song.

America the Beautiful may also refer to:

Film and television
America the Beautiful (2007 film), an American documentary film
America the Beautiful (Disney film), created using 360 film techniques and 360-degree cameras
"America the Beautiful" (Duckman), a 1995 episode of Duckman
"America the Beautiful" (Outlander), a 2018 episode of Outlander

Other uses
America the Beautiful Pass, a series of passes to protected areas in the US
America the Beautiful quarters, a series of 25-cent pieces issued by the US Mint

See also